Euophrys kawkaban is a jumping spider species in the genus Euophrys that lives in the Yemen. It was first described in 2007.

References

Salticidae
Spiders described in 2007
Spiders of Asia
Taxa named by Wanda Wesołowska